George Thomas Washington (June 24, 1908 – August 21, 1971) was a United States circuit judge of the United States Court of Appeals for the District of Columbia Circuit.

Education and career

Washington was born in Cuyahoga Falls, Ohio, the son of  William Morrow Washington and Janet Margaret (Thomas) Washington. He was a descendant of Samuel Washington, brother of George Washington. He received a Bachelor of Philosophy degree from Yale University in 1928. He received a Bachelor of Letters in law from Oxford University in 1931 on a Rhodes Scholarship. He received a Bachelor of Laws from Yale Law School in 1932. He was in private practice of law in New York City, New York from 1932 to 1938. He was a faculty member at Cornell Law School from 1938 to 1942 and was a Professor of Law in 1942. He was an attorney for the Office of Emergency Management in 1942. He was a United States economic representative in Baghdad, Iraq from 1942 to 1943. He was Chief of the United States Lend-Lease Mission in Tehran, Iran from 1943 to 1944. He was a special assistant to the United States Attorney General from 1944 to 1946. He was an Assistant Solicitor General of the United States from 1946 to 1949. He was Acting Solicitor General of the United States from 1946 to 1947. He was a legal adviser to the United States Delegation to the United Nations Conference on Freedom of the Press in Geneva, Switzerland in 1948.

Federal judicial service

Washington received a recess appointment from President Harry S. Truman on October 21, 1949, to the United States Court of Appeals for the District of Columbia Circuit, to a new seat created by 63 Stat. 493. He was nominated to the same seat by President Truman on January 5, 1950. He was confirmed by the United States Senate on April 28, 1950, and received his commission on May 1, 1950. He assumed senior status due to a certified disability on November 10, 1965. His service was terminated on August 21, 1971, due to his death at his home in Santa Barbara, California. He was survived by his wife, the former Helen Goodner.

References

External links
  Biographical information for George Thomas Washington from The Political Graveyard.
 

1908 births
1971 deaths
People from Cuyahoga Falls, Ohio
American Rhodes Scholars
Alumni of Oriel College, Oxford
Yale Law School alumni
Cornell University faculty
American legal scholars
United States Assistant Attorneys General for the Office of Legal Counsel
Judges of the United States Court of Appeals for the D.C. Circuit
United States court of appeals judges appointed by Harry S. Truman
20th-century American judges
George Thomas
20th-century American lawyers